2017 Independence Cup may refer to:

2017 Independence Cup (cricket), a cricket tournament in Pakistan
2017 Lesotho Independence Cup, a football tournament in Lesotho
2017 Independence Cup (Albania), a football tournament in Albania

See also
Independence Cup (disambiguation), including tournaments held in 2017
2017–18 Independence Cup (Bangladesh), a football tournament in Bangladesh, succeeding 2016 edition and preceding 2018 edition